Franklin Virtual High School (or FVHS) is a private online high school located in Tallahassee, Florida. It was established in 2010 and provides its entire academic program online only (virtual campus).

Description
Franklin Virtual High School provides programs and services that are designed for both teenage and adult students. Programs of study, which are offered via distance learning, include a complete high school curriculum.

Accreditation
FVHS is accredited by AdvancED and is registered with the Florida Board of Education School Choice for Private Education database.

Mission
Provide quality, flexible, cost-effective education options to help students achieve their personal, educational and career goals.

References

External links
Official site

2010 establishments in Florida
Educational institutions established in 2010
Online schools in the United States
Private schools in Florida
Schools in Tallahassee, Florida